Shahram Qadir    is an Iranian filmmaker, screenwriter, and photographer.  He grew up in Iran in Teheran, Qom, and West Azerbaijan. Shahram lives in Sweden since 1992. He is a master graduate of Södertörn University  in Art and Art History in Sweden.

Filmography

References

Radio Sweden, Sweden 2013

VOA Persian, Voice of America 2018

Vivente Andante Magazine, Portugal 2020

Expresso Magazine, Portugal 2020

Hawler Newspaper, Iraq 2020

Hawler Newspaper, Iraq 2020

Kurdsat TV, Iraq 2020

External links
 
 
 VOA Persian, Ekran, 2017
 KNNC, TV interview, 2017
 KNN, An interview with Shahram Qadir, February 2016
 Voice of America VOA persian, An interview with Shahram Qadir, October 2010
 High Beam Research, The Emigrated Birds coming soon, February 2012
  Hewler Magazine, 29 March 2011
  TAW Magazine, July 2008
  Peyk Magazine, January 2013
 Mobarez Online Magazine, 3 February 2013
 Radio Sweden

Iranian male film actors
Iranian film directors
Iranian screenwriters
Kurdish film directors
Iranian Kurdish people
Living people
Year of birth missing (living people)
Södertörn University alumni